This page documents all tornadoes confirmed by various weather forecast offices of the National Weather Service in the United States from July to September 2022. On average, there are 134 confirmed tornadoes in the United States in July, 83 in August, 74 in September, and 61 in October.

July and August were both significantly below average, with only 66 and 32 tornadoes being confirmed respectively. Unlike previous years, little to no tropical cyclone activity was present during this time, and no tropical tornadoes occurred as a result. September had seven tropical tornadoes, which were produced by Hurricane Ian, but only five other tornadoes touched down during the month, leaving it significantly below average with only 25 tornadoes. October was also well below average with only 29 tornadoes.

United States yearly total

July

July 4 event

July 5 event

July 6 event

July 7 event

July 8 event

July 9 event

July 11 event

July 12 event

July 13 event

July 16 event

July 17 event

July 18 event

July 19 event

July 20 event

July 22 event

July 23 event

July 26 event

July 28 event

July 29 event

July 31 event

August

August 1 event

August 4 event

August 5 event

August 8 event

August 15 event

August 17 event

August 18 event

August 20 event

August 21 event

August 22 event

August 23 event

August 24 event

August 25 event

August 26 event

August 27 event

August 28 event

August 29 event

September

September 4 event

September 10 event

September 13 event

September 18 event

September 19 event

September 22 event

September 25 event

September 27 event

September 28 event

September 30 event

October

October 3 event

October 8 event

October 12 event

October 13 event

October 16 event

October 17 event

October 22 event

October 24 event

October 25 event

October 29 event

October 30 event

See also
 Tornadoes of 2022
 List of United States tornadoes from May to June 2022
 List of United States tornadoes from November to December 2022

Notes

References

2022-related lists
Tornadoes of 2022
2022 natural disasters in the United States
Tornadoes in the United States
2022 meteorology